Hans Stüwe (14 May 1901 – 13 May 1976) was a German film actor.

Selected filmography
 Prinz Louis Ferdinand (1927)
 Potsdam (1927)
 The Transformation of Dr. Bessel (1927)
 The Bordello in Rio (1927)
 Assassination (1927)
 Villa Falconieri (1928)
 The Prince of Rogues (1928)
 Pawns of Passion (1928)
 The Sinner (1928)
 It's You I Have Loved (1929)
 Hungarian Nights (1929)
 Cagliostro (1929)
 Poison Gas (1929)
 Echo of a Dream (1930)
 Retreat on the Rhine (1930)
 The Woman They Talk About (1931)
 Alarm at Midnight (1931)
 Ash Wednesday (1931)
 A Woman Branded (1931)
 The Dancer of Sanssouci (1932)
 Trenck (1932)
 Tannenberg (1932)
 The Master Detective (1933)
 At the Strasbourg (1934)
 You Are Adorable, Rosmarie (1934)
 The Saint and Her Fool (1935)
 The Private Life of Louis XIV (1935)
 The Tiger of Eschnapur (1938)
 The Indian Tomb (1938)
 The Life and Loves of Tschaikovsky (1939)
 Three Fathers for Anna (1939)
 Passion (1940)
 Back Then (1943)
 The Enchanted Day (1944)
 Gaspary's Sons (1948)
 The Heath is Green (1951)
 At the Well in Front of the Gate (1952)
 When The Village Music Plays on Sunday Nights (1953)
 Come Back (1953)
 Ave Maria (1953)
 Daybreak (1954)
 The Ambassador's Wife (1955)

Bibliography
 O'Brien, Mary-Elizabeth. Nazi Cinema as Enchantment: The Politics of Entertainment in the Third Reich. Camden House, 2004.

External links

1901 births
1976 deaths
People from Halle (Saale)
People from the Province of Saxony
German male film actors
German male silent film actors
20th-century German male actors